Selvi Ramajayam is an Indian politician an ex Member of the Legislative Assembly of Tamil Nadu from Bhuvanagiri constituency. As a cadre of Anna Dravida Munnetra Kazhagam, She was previously elected to the same Bhuvanagiri constituency in 2006 and 2011 elections.

References 

Members of the Tamil Nadu Legislative Assembly
All India Anna Dravida Munnetra Kazhagam politicians
Living people
21st-century Indian women politicians
21st-century Indian politicians
Place of birth missing (living people)
Year of birth missing (living people)
Women members of the Tamil Nadu Legislative Assembly